Godfrey Hugh Lancelot Lemay (1919-2012) was a tutor and Emeritus Fellow at Worcester College, University of Oxford, and a former Dean of History at Worcester College.

His focus area was modern British history. Born in South Africa, LeMay's family travelled from England to South Africa during the Boer Wars, in which his grandfather was an officer. LeMay served as a speech writer for Winston Churchill.

He was a political advisor to Nelson Mandela. LeMay's most famous student was Benazir Bhutto.

He was living in Oxford with his wife when he died in December 2012 at the age of 93. LeMay was teaching up until his death, holding tutorial sessions in his in-home office.

References

Primary Sources
 Le May, G.H.L., British Supremacy in South Africa, 1899-1907, Oxford: Clarendon, 1965
 Le May, G.H.L., British Government, 1914-1963, London: Methuen, 1964
 Le May, G.H.L., “British Government, 1914-1953”, London: Methuen, 1955
 Le May, G.H.L., The Victorian Constitution, New York: St. Martin, 1979
 Le May, G.H.L., “The Afrikaners”, New York: Wiley, 1995
 Le May, G.H.L., “Black and White in South Africa”, New York: American Heritage, 1971
 Le May, G.H.L., “Freedom and Authority; text of an address given 5 September 1962”, Johannesburg: Witswatersrand Univ., 1963
 Le May, G.H.L. “South Africa, the future: text of an address by Prof. G.H.L LeMay, 5 September 1967”, Cape Town: C.A. Alger, 1967

1919 births
2012 deaths
South African academics
South African emigrants to the United Kingdom
Fellows of Worcester College, Oxford